The 2006 Carlisle City Council election took place on 4 May 2006 to elect members of Carlisle District Council in Cumbria, England. One third of the council was up for election and the council stayed under no overall control.

After the election, the composition of the council was:
Labour 24
Conservative 19
Liberal Democrats 8
Independent 1

Background
Before the election the Conservatives ran the council with 20 seats and the backing of the 7 Liberal Democrats. Labour was in opposition despite being the largest group on the council with 24 seats and needed 3 gains to take control.

19 of the 52 seats on the council were being elected, with extra seats contested in Stanwix Rural and Upperby wards after the sitting councillors, Conservative Edward Firth and Labour's Caroline Watson, stood down. Labour were defending 9 seats, compared to 8 for the Conservatives and 2 Liberal Democrats. Candidates at the election included 11 independents standing to protest against the demolition of the Warwick Road cinema and the first candidate from the English Democrats Party in Belah ward.

Before the election top Labour targets were reported as being Morton and Castle from the Liberal Democrats and Belah from the Conservatives. The Conservatives were targeting Yewdale from Labour, while the Liberal Democrats aimed to take Dalston from the Conservatives.

Election result
Labour remained the largest party on the council with 24 councillors after only one seat changed hands. The Liberal Democrats gained Dalston from the Conservatives, to go up to 8 seats, while the Conservatives dropped to 19 and there remained 1 independent. Overall turnout at the election was 34.6%, down from 42.6% at the 2004 election.

Following the election Michael Boaden became the new leader of the Labour group, after challenging the previous leader Heather Bradley. However Conservative Mike Mitchelson remained as council leader after being re-elected by 26 votes to 25 at the annual council meeting on 22 May. This came after the Liberal Democrats backed the Conservatives and Liberal Democrat Peter Farmer was elected mayor by the same margin.

Ward results

References

2006 English local elections
2006
2000s in Cumbria